Claudia Strobl (born 4 November 1965, in Afritz) is an Austrian former alpine skier who competed in the 1992 Winter Olympics.

External links
 sports-reference.com
 

1965 births
Living people
Austrian female alpine skiers
Olympic alpine skiers of Austria
Alpine skiers at the 1992 Winter Olympics